The 2011 Taça da Liga Final was the fourth final of the Taça da Liga tournament in Portugal, a competition involving the top 32 clubs in the Portuguese football league system, the Primeira Liga and the Liga de Honra teams. The final was contested on 23 April 2011 by Benfica and Paços de Ferreira and was played at the Estádio Cidade de Coimbra in Coimbra. This was the first time that the final was played at this stadium since the past three editions were at the Estádio Algarve in Faro. This was the third consecutive final appearance for Benfica and the first ever for Paços de Ferreira.

Background
Benfica went into the match as the Taça da Liga title holder, having won the previous two finals, in 2009 and 2010, while this was the first ever Paços de Ferreira appearance in the decisive game. Both teams started at difference stages in the competition — Paços de Ferreira in the second round, as part of the six last teams from the previous Primeira Liga and two promoted teams from last year's Liga de Honra, and Benfica in the third round, comprising the faction of the top eight Primeira Liga teams from the last season. After overcoming Leixões in a two-legged fixture, following an away draw and a home victory, Paços de Ferreira topped Group C, composed by the two Minho rivals, Braga and Vitória de Guimarães, as well as Arouca. Benfica won Group B, which included Marítimo, Desportivo das Aves and Olhanense. The two teams won their respective groups with the perfect score of three victories out of three matches. In the semi-finals, Benfica hosted and won over Lisbon rivals Sporting CP, with a late winner coming in the last moments of stoppage time, after being one goal down during the first half. Paços de Ferreira played at Nacional's stadium and won an entertaining match that ended in a 4–3 result, controlling the scoreline during much part of the second half due to an early two-goal advantage.

Route to the final

Note: In all results below, the score of the finalist is given first (H: home; A: away).

Match

Details

External links 
Official site
Official regulation 
Official Statistics 
José Moreira Wins Man Of The Match Award

2011
Taca da Liga
F.C. Paços de Ferreira matches
S.L. Benfica matches